Guruprasad is an Indian actor and director in the Kannada film industry. His debut as a director was the 2006 film Mata which became a cult hit and his second movie as a director is Eddelu Manjunatha. Both the films were received with rave reviews and were considered for many award categories. He is known for portraying satire in a realistic way on the screen.

Filmography

As a director

As an actor

As dialogue writer

Television

Awards
 2010 – Best Director for Eddelu Manjunatha at the Filmfare Awards

References

External links
 
Guruprasad save Rs 2 lakhs by not drinking
 Guruprasad-relaunches-directors-special

Living people
Place of birth unknown
Male actors from Bangalore
Kannada film directors
Male actors in Kannada cinema
Filmfare Awards South winners
Film directors from Bangalore
Kannada screenwriters
21st-century Indian male actors
Indian male film actors
1972 births
Bigg Boss Kannada contestants